This is the discography for Canadian death metal band Kataklysm.

Studio albums

Live albums

EPs

Demos

Split albums

Music videos

References 

Discographies of Canadian artists
Heavy metal group discographies